The Lesser Evil may refer to:

 The Lesser Evil (1912 film), a 1912 silent film
 The Lesser Evil (1998 film), a 1998 drama film
 The Lesser Evil (1993-95 comic books) set in The Witcher universe
 The Lesser Evil (Brenner book), a 1988 book by Lenni Brenner
 The Lesser Evil: Political Ethics in an Age of Terror, a 2005 book by Michael Ignatieff
Lesser Evil may refer to:

 Star Wars: Thrawn Ascendancy: Lesser Evil (2021), the third novel in a Star Wars trilogy

See also 
 Lesser of two evils principle
 "The Lesser of Two Evils", an episode of Futurama